John Dempsey (1848-1884) was a United States Navy sailor and a recipient of the United States military's highest decoration, the Medal of Honor.

Biography
Born in 1848 in Ireland, Dempsey immigrated to the United States and joined the U.S. Navy from Massachusetts. On that day, while Kearsarge was at Shanghai, China, he jumped overboard and rescued a shipmate from drowning. For this action, he was awarded the Medal of Honor.

Dempsey's official Medal of Honor citation reads:
On board the U.S.S. Kearsarge at Shanghai, China, 23 January 1875. Displaying gallant conduct, Dempsey jumped overboard from the Kearsarge and rescued from drowning one of the crew of that vessel.

See also

List of Medal of Honor recipients during peacetime

References

External links

1848 births
1884 deaths
Irish emigrants to the United States (before 1923)
United States Navy sailors
United States Navy Medal of Honor recipients
Irish-born Medal of Honor recipients
Irish sailors in the United States Navy
Non-combat recipients of the Medal of Honor